C115 may refer to 

 Occupation Safety and Health Convention of 1981, an international labor standard
 Motorola C115, a GSM mobile phone  from Motorola